Carlos Antonio Ascues Ávila (born 19 June 1992), also known as Pogbascues, due to his physical and technical similarities to Paul Pogba, is a Peruvian professional footballer who plays as a central midfielder or as a striker on occasion for Peruvian Primera División side Alianza Atlético.

Club career

Early career 
Born in Caracas, Venezuela to Peruvian parents of African descent, Ascues began his youth career at Alianza Lima and moved up to the first team in the 2011 season. He finally made his professional league debut in the Torneo Descentralizado on 15 May 2011 in the 2–0 away win over Sport Huancayo.

Move to Europe 
On 11 August 2012, Ascues signed for Portuguese side Benfica but was immediately sent to the B-team where he played 22 times in the second division.

On 21 August 2013, Ascues signed a two-year contract with Panetolikos in Greece.

Return to Peru 
However, in January 2014, Ascues returned to Peru when he joined Universidad San Martin in a one-year loan deal. On 3 February 2015, Ascues returned to Peru on a permanent deal when he signed a two-year contract with Melgar of the Primera División.

VfL Wolfsburg 
On 23 July 2015, Ascues returned to Europe, signing a three-year deal with Bundesliga side VfL Wolfsburg for a fee of €1.5 million. He made his debut for the team as a substitute on 1 April 2016, subbing on for Robin Knoche in the 82nd minute of a defeat to 3–0 away defeat to Bayer Leverkusen. The only other senior appearance he would make was in a DfB Pokal first round game against FSV Frankfurt the following season.

Third spell in Peru 
On 3 January 2017, Ascues rejoined former club Melgar on loan until the end of the 2016–17 Bundesliga season. Upon the completion of the loan, he rejoined another of his former clubs, Alianza Lima, for the second half of the season. Ascues played 10 games and scored four goals as Alianza Lima won the 2017 Peruvian Primera División title.

Orlando City 
On August 16, 2018, he joined Orlando City on loan until the end of the 2018 MLS season with an option for a 12-month extension. He made his debut in a 2–1 defeat to Atlanta United on August 25 and started every remaining game except for the final day of the season when he was ruled out with a quad injury as Orlando lost 1–0 to New York Red Bulls. The loan was extended for the 2019 season. On November 21, 2019, it was announced Ascues had his contract option for the 2020 season declined by Orlando as part of the end-of-season roster decisions.

Club statistics

International career
In 2011, Ascues featured for and was captain of the Peru U20 side at the 2011 Sudamericano U-20.

On 6 August 2014, Ascues made his full senior debut for the Peruvian national team, scoring two goals in a 3–0 friendly win against Panama. He was a member of the squad that finished in third place at the 2015 Copa América and also featured six times during the 2018 FIFA World Cup qualification as Peru finished fifth before beating New Zealand in a playoff to reach the team's first World Cup since 1982. However, Ascues was not selected for the tournament.

International goals

Honours 
Alianza Lima

 Peruvian Primera División: 2017

References

External links
 
 
 

1992 births
Living people
Footballers from Caracas
Peruvian footballers
Peru international footballers
Peru youth international footballers
Venezuelan people of Peruvian descent
Citizens of Peru through descent
Club Alianza Lima footballers
S.L. Benfica B players
Liga Portugal 2 players
Peruvian Primera División players
Panetolikos F.C. players
VfL Wolfsburg players
Association football central defenders
Association football midfielders
2015 Copa América players
FBC Melgar footballers
Club Deportivo Universidad de San Martín de Porres players
Peruvian expatriate footballers
Expatriate footballers in Portugal
Expatriate footballers in Greece
Expatriate footballers in Germany
Orlando City SC players
Major League Soccer players